Pravat Chowdhury (born 28 December 1976) is an Indian politician and member of the Communist Party of India (Marxist).  Chowdhury is a member of the Tripura Legislative Assembly from the Manu (Vidhan Sabha constituency) in South Tripura district since 2014. Chowdhury was elected in a 2014 bye-election to this seat, after the previous incumbent, Jitendra Choudhury, resigned to take his Lok Sabha seat for Tripura East after winning in 2014. Pravat Chowdhury won the bye-election by a landslide, leading by a record margin of nearly 16,000 votes. Chowdhury won reelection to a full term during the 2018 Tripura Legislative Assembly election, but this time by a much smaller margin. His victory by 193 votes, or 0.48%, against Dhananjoy Tripura of the Indigenous People's Front of Tripura was the closest contest in the state.

See also
 Jitendra Choudhury
 Radhacharan Debbarma
 Badal Chowdhury

References 

Living people
People from South Tripura district
Communist Party of India (Marxist) politicians from Tripura
1976 births
Tripura MLAs 2013–2018